Flatormenis is a genus of flatid planthoppers in the family Flatidae. There are about 15 described species in Flatormenis.

Species

 Flatormenis albescens (Fowler, 1900) c g
 Flatormenis albipennis (Van Duzee, 1907) c g
 Flatormenis dolabrata (Fowler, 1900) c g
 Flatormenis fumata (Schmidt, 1904) c g
 Flatormenis fusca (Melichar, 1902) c g
 Flatormenis glaucescens (Walker, 1858) c g
 Flatormenis gliseoalba (Fowler, 1900) c g
 Flatormenis griseoalba (Fowler, 1900) c g
 Flatormenis inferior (Fowler, 1900) c g
 Flatormenis panamensis (Schmidt, 1904) c g
 Flatormenis proxima (Walker, 1851) c g b (northern flatid planthopper)
 Flatormenis pseudomarginata (Muir, 1924) c g
 Flatormenis saucia Van Duzee, 1912 c g b
 Flatormenis squamulosa (Fowler, 1900) c g
 Flatormenis tarnabensis Ahmed & Rao, 1986 c g

Data sources: i = ITIS, c = Catalogue of Life, g = GBIF, b = Bugguide.net

References

Further reading

External links

 

Flatidae
Auchenorrhyncha genera